Darreh Saki (also Romanized as Darreh Sākī) is a village in Dowreh Rural District, Chegeni District, Dowreh County, Lorestan Province, Iran. At the 2006 census, its population was 49, in 10 families.

References 

Towns and villages in Dowreh County